Uwe Münch is an East German sprint canoer who competed in the early 1990s. He won a silver medal in the K-4 500 m event at the 1990 ICF Canoe Sprint World Championships in Poznań.

References

German male canoeists
Living people
Year of birth missing (living people)
ICF Canoe Sprint World Championships medalists in kayak